The Miami Nice Jazz Festival is a jazz festival in Miami, Florida. It is a continuation of the festival which started in 1948 in Nice, France, which took place in the Opéra de Nice. This venue was one of the early theaters to broadcast over the radio. The Nice Jazz festival received its popularity from musicians such as Louis Armstrong.

The festival was next held 23 years later in 1971 with Ella Fitzgerald, Helen Humes, Pharoah Sanders, T-Bone Walker, Stéphane Grappelli, Django Reinhardt, Herbie Hancock, Oscar Peterson, Roy Eldridge, John Lewis, Al Grey, Percy Heath, Connie Key, Dizzy Gillespie, NHØP, Daniel Humair, Sonny Stitt, Canonball Adderley, the Modern Jazz Quartet, Charlie Mingus, Max Roach, and Miles Davis.
Since 1971, it has been an annual event. Since 2011, the festival has been run by Christian Estrosi, mayor of Nice.

References

External links
 Official site 
2010s establishments in Florida
Jazz festivals in the United States
Music festivals in Miami
Tourist attractions in Miami